Olearia ledifolia, commonly known as rock daisy bush, is a species of flowering plant of the family Asteraceae. It is endemic to Tasmania and found at higher altitudes where it grows as a low, compact bush with tough, leathery leaves and small white and yellow daisy-like "flowers" in summer.

Description 
The branches are numerous and densely packed with young growth covered in fine rust-coloured hairs. The lower sections of the branches may have raised scars from leaves that fall off after one or two years. The upper surface of the leaf is usually glabrous, with the margins of the leaf rolled down and inwards. The lower leaf surface is covered in fine hairs that may appear rusty brown to silver.

The heads or daisy-like "flowers" contain numerous florets, with involucral bracts at the base. The heads are borne singly on short peduncles in the leaf axils near the tips of branches. The fruit is a shiny, glabrous achene with seed dispersal being assisted by dry, wind borne pappus. Flowering occurs in the southern hemisphere summer months of January and February.

Taxonomy
This species was first formally described in 1836 by Augustin Pyramus de Candolle who gave it the name Eurybia ledifolia in his Prodromus Systematis Naturalis Regni Vegetabilis from specimens collected in rocky places on Mount Wellington by Allan Cunningham. In 1867, George Bentham changed the name to Olearia ledifolia in Flora Australiensis. The specific epithet (ledifolia) is derived from the Greek 'ledos' (woollen cloth) and the Latin 'folium' (leaf), referring to the hairy under surface of the leaves.

Distribution and habitat 
Olearia ledifolia is endemic to the island state of Tasmania and has been recorded on King Island. It is a common species in alpine heath, bolster heath, deciduous heath, fjaeldmark, alpine sedgeland and coniferous heath at altitudes above 1000m. Its common name, the rock daisy bush, refers to its preference for sheltered rocky slopes and scree fields amongst mountain plateaus.

Ecology 
Olearia ledifolia may become a co-dominant species at higher altitudes where the growth of trees is limited by climatic factors. These environments are subject to snow and ice, low temperatures, strong winds and high UV levels. The primary threat to the plant communities where O. ledifolia grows is fire, with frequent burning greatly decreasing the likelihood of recovery and leading to species impoverishment. However, it is unclear what the response of O. ledifolia is to fire at the species level. Other threats include trampling, grazing pressures from livestock and climate change.

Strongly revolute leaf margins are a frequently recorded xeromorphic adaptions for plants that are subject to water stress, especially when coupled with growths of hair like trichomes. The morphology of the leaf serves to increase the boundary layer between the stomata positioned on the underside of the leaf and the external desiccating environment, thus preventing water loss during gas exchange. The classically thin skeletal soils of alpine Tasmania where O. ledifolia occurs have limited water holding capacity and are often subject to summer drought conditions.

Similar species 
Due to its growth habit and the leaf morphology, Olearia ledifolia bears strong superficial resemblance to Orites revoluta (a member of the Proteaceae family) when not bearing reproductive structures. Compounding possible misidentification, these species are regularly found growing in close association with each other. The two species can be separated by the lack of hairy leaves, proteaceous flowers and splitting follicles of O. revoluta.

Cultivation 
Olearia ledifolia is rarely cultivated because of its restrictive habitat requirements. However, surface sowing of freshly collected seed that has been allowed to dry has yielded some success, with germination occurring in 2 – 5 weeks. It prefers well-drained, moist, acidic soil in full sun and is frost and wind tolerant. It has proven resistant to the soil-borne disease Phytophthora cinnamomi, but it is intolerant to phosphorus.

References 

ledifolia
Flora of Tasmania
Asterales of Australia
Endemic flora of Tasmania